1:42.08 (alternatively known as 1:42.08: A Man and His Car or 1:42.08: To Qualify) is George Lucas's senior project at the University of Southern California in 1966. It was named for the lap time of the Lotus 23 race car that was the subject of the film.

It is a non-story visual tone poem depicting the imagery of a car going at full speed, and featuring the car's engine as the primary sound element. Shot on 16mm color film with a 14-man student crew, it was filmed at Willow Springs Raceway, north of Los Angeles, California. The Lotus 23 was driven by Pete Brock.

Lucas cited the influence of Jean-Claude Labrecque's 1965 short documentary on a cycling competition, 60 Cycles, on 1:42.08.

See also
List of American films of 1966

References

External links

1966 films
Documentary films about auto racing
Short films directed by George Lucas
American short documentary films
Films without speech
American auto racing films
American student films
1960s short documentary films
Films shot in California
Films set in California
1960s English-language films
1960s American films